Kermejegan (also Romanized as Kermejegān, Karmajegān, and Kermejgān; also known as Garmachegān, Harmajehgān, and Karamjakan) is a village in Kahak Rural District, Kahak District, Qom County, Qom Province, Iran. At the 2016 census, its population was 3082 in families.

References 

Populated places in Qom Province